David Lockard, aka Red Ezra, is an American Director, Producer, Editor, writer and Photographer.  He has directed over 30 adult videos since 2000, for companies such as Vivid Entertainment, Wicked Pictures, Metro and New Sensations. He runs the film production company, Red Ezra, and the post-production company, Hacksaw Post. Lockard initially entered the adult industry as an Editor, working under the name Hacksaw. He has also written scripts for several videos under the name Joe Ezrahaus. Lockard has directed several mainstream long form music videos, such as "Dimevision Vol. One" and "Pantera Home Video Part 3", which both reached No. 1 on the Billboard video sales chart.

Awards
2000 AVN Award nominee – Best Videography – Serenity In Denim
2001 AVN Award nominee – Best Editing Video – In Style
2002 AVN Award nominee – Best Vignette Tape – Fast Cars & Tiki Bars
2002 AVN Award nominee – Best All-Sex Video – Love Shack 
2002 AVN Award nominee – Best Director - Video – Fast Cars & Tiki Bars
2002 AVN Award nominee – Best Editing - Video – Fast Cars & Tiki Bars
2002 AVN Award nominee – Best Director - Video – Love Shack
2002 AVN Award nominee – Best Art Direction - Video – Fast Cars & Tiki Bars
2002 AVN Award nominee – Best All-Girl Feature – Flash!
2003 AVN Award nominee – Best Director, Video – Hearts & Minds
2003 AVN Award nominee – Best Vignette Tape – Hearts & Minds
2003 AVN Award WINNER – Best Art Direction, Video – Hearts & Minds
2003 AVN Award nominee – Best Art Direction, Video – Sweetwater
2003 AVN Award nominee – Best Videography – Roadblock
2003 AVN Award nominee – Best Special Effects – Riders
2004 AVN Award nominee – Best Art Direction, Video – Angel X
2004 AVN Award nominee – Best All-Girl Feature – Pussy Sweat
2005 AVN Award nominee – Best Video Feature – The Getaway
2006 AVN Award nominee – Best Video Feature – Drive
2006 AVN Award nominee – Best Director, Video – Taboo 21
2006 AVN Award nominee – Best Screenplay, Video – Drive
2006 AVN Award nominee – Best Videography – Blu Dreams: Sweet Solos
2006 AVN Award WINNER – Best Solo Video – Blu Dreams: Sweet Solos
2007 AVN Award nominee – Best Director, Non-Feature – McKenzie Made
2007 AVN Award nominee – Best All-Sex Release – McKenzie Made
2007 AVN Award nominee – Best Art Direction - Video – McKenzie Made
2007 AVN Award nominee – Best Videography – The Visitors
2009 AVN Award nominee – Best Editing - Video – Succubus of the Rouge
2009 AVN Award nominee – Best Special Effects – Succubus of the Rouge

References

External links
 
 
 
 
 

American film directors
Living people
Year of birth missing (living people)